The Social Network is a 2010 film written by Aaron Sorkin and directed by David Fincher. As of June 21, 2012, the film has received 122 awards from 203 nominations.

Awards and nominations

Organizations

Guild awards

Critics groups

References

External links
 

Lists of accolades by film